The 1998 Norwegian Football Cup was the 93rd edition of the Norwegian Football Cup and was won by Stabæk after defeating Rosenborg in the final at Ullevaal Stadion on 1 November.

Because of Norway's participation in the 1998 FIFA World Cup, the clubs playing in Tippeligaen entered the competition in the third round.

Calendar
Below are the dates for each round as given by the official schedule:

First round

|colspan="3" style="background-color:#97DEFF"|21 April 1998

|-
|colspan="3" style="background-color:#97DEFF"|22 April 1998

 

|-
|colspan="3" style="background-color:#97DEFF"|23 April 1998

 

|}

Byåsen had a walkover.

Second round

|colspan="3" style="background-color:#97DEFF"|13 May 1998

 

|}

Third round

|colspan="3" style="background-color:#97DEFF"|3 June 1998
 

|-
|colspan="3" style="background-color:#97DEFF"|4 June 1998

|}

Fourth round

|colspan="3" style="background-color:#97DEFF"|15 July 1998
 
 
 
 
 

|-
|colspan="3" style="background-color:#97DEFF"|16 July 1998

|}

Quarter-finals

Semi-finals

Final

References
http://www.rsssf.no

Norwegian Football Cup seasons
Norway
Football Cup